Birds described in 1875 include the Anjouan sparrowhawk, Caucasian grouse, Nelson's sparrow, yellow-capped pygmy parrot, red-tailed shrike, spotted catbird, spectacled barwing, tit berrypecker, bridled honeyeater and Taczanowski's tinamou.

Events
Death of Carl Jakob Sundevall
Death of John Edward Gray
Joseph Marshall Wade establishes a popular journal The Ornithologist and Oologist

Publications
Howard Irby The Ornithology of the Straits of Gibraltar R. H. Porter, 1875
Richard Bowdler Sharpe Catalogue of the Striges, Or Nocturnal Birds of Prey, in the Collection of the British Museum. (1875).
John Gould The birds of New Guinea and the adjacent Papuan islands : including many new species recently discovered in Australia London :Henry Sotheran & Co.,1875-1888. online BHL

Ongoing events
Theodor von Heuglin Ornithologie von Nordost-Afrika (Ornithology of Northeast Africa) (Cassel, 1869–1875)
John Gould The Birds of Asia 1850-83 7 vols. 530 plates, Artists: J. Gould, H. C. Richter, W. Hart and J. Wolf; Lithographers: H. C. Richter and W. Hart
Henry Eeles Dresser and Richard Bowdler Sharpe  A History of the Birds of Europe, Including all the Species Inhabiting the Western Palearctic Region. Taylor & Francis of Fleet Street, London.
Etienne Mulsant, Histoire Naturelle des Oiseaux-Mouches, ou Colibris constituant la famille des Trochilides (published 1874-77)
Paolo Savi Ornitologia Italiana Firenze :Successori Le Monnier,1873-1876. (opera posthuma 1873–1876) 
The Ibis

References

Bird
Birding and ornithology by year